The Episcopal Diocese of Duluth was a diocese of the Episcopal Church in the United States of America.
The diocese was created as the Missionary District of Duluth in 1895 as a result of the division of the Diocese of Minnesota. The Missionary District was reconstituted as a diocese at its twelfth annual convocation on June 19, 1907. The diocese reunited with the Diocese of Minnesota in 1944. The former cathedral in Duluth, Minnesota was sold to a Lutheran church in 1956.

Bishops of the Diocese
James Dow Morrison, Missionary Bishop (1896–1906), Diocesan bishop (1907–1921)
Granville Gaylord Bennett (1921–1933)
Benjamin Tibbets Kemerer, Coadjutor bishop (1930-1933, Diocesan bishop (1933–1943)

References

The Episcopal Church Annual. Morehouse Publishing: New York, NY (2005).

External links 
Journal of the Annual Convention

Duluth, Minnesota
Duluth
Religious organizations established in 1895
1943 disestablishments in the United States
Duluth
Duluth
1895 establishments in Minnesota
Episcopal church buildings in Minnesota